St. Francis School, founded in 1978, is an English medium, co-educational school established and directed by the Third Order of Saint Francis at Ranchi, Jharkhand. The school is affiliated with the Council for the Indian School Certificate Examination.

Staffed by Sisters, Fathers and Brothers, the T.O.R. Franciscan Society runs several English- and regional language-medium schools in India. Recognised as a Christian Minority Institution, the primary purpose of the school is to educate Christian children. However, children belonging to other religions are also admitted.

The school's motto is "Truth, Love and Peace".

Curriculum
The medium of instruction is English, but a special emphasis is given to Hindi. The complete curriculum consists of English, Hindi, Sanskrit, history, civics, geography, economics, mathematics, physics, chemistry, and biology. Character formation and development of spiritual values are imparted regularly to students through the teaching of moral science and values education. Physical education, Socially Useful Productive Work (SUPW) and community service also form part of the curriculum.

Co-curricular activities 
In addition, handicraft, karate, yoga, vocal music, instrumental music, guitar, drum, synthesizer, marching band, sports, etc., are part of the curriculum. There is a class devoted to developing skills in a number of literary and cultural pursuits. All students are compelled to join a club of their choice.

Partial Club List 
 Art
 Science
 Quiz
 Elocution
 Eco
 Writers' Forum
 Drama
 Music
 School's

Facilities

Smartclass 
St. Francis School is among the school in Ranchi that has converted all classrooms into Smartclasses (classrooms equipped with "Smartboards"). Every classroom in the school is equipped with a computer, overhead projector, and Smartboard. The set-up in each class is linked by LAN to a server that stores an array of educational content. Teachers use the Smartboards for teaching purposes, to store lessons, and to demonstrate the ready-made content available on the server.

English Language laboratory 
Another addition of technology-facilitated education is an English Language laboratory. This application allows the students to improve their spoken language by hearing and practising correct pronunciation. They are able to then check their progress in a personalized manner. The Language Lab has a number of computers with earphones and speakers.

See also
Education in India
Literacy in India
List of schools in India

References

External links
 

Franciscan education
Catholic schools in India
Christian schools in Jharkhand
Private schools in Jharkhand
Schools in Ranchi
Educational institutions established in 1978
1978 establishments in Bihar